Breno França Sidoti (born 16 March 1983) is a Brazilian former professional road cyclist.

Major results

2003
 1st Stage 3 Tour de Santa Catarina
 3rd Copa América de Ciclismo
2004
 2nd Overall Volta Ciclística de Porto Alegre
 3rd Overall Tour do Brasil
1st Stage 4
 3rd Overall Tour do Rio
2005
 National Under-23 Road Championships
1st  Road race
1st  Time trial
 1st Stage 4 Volta do Paraná
 1st Stage 3 Tour de Santa Catarina
 3rd Overall Volta Ciclística de Porto Alegre
 7th Overall Volta de Ciclismo Internacional do Estado de São Paulo
2006
 2nd  Road race, Pan American Road Championships
 2nd Trofeo Zsšdi
2009
 1st Overall Tour do Rio
1st Stage 1 
 1st Stage 5b (ITT) Rutas de America
 6th Overall Volta Ciclística Internacional do Rio Grande do Sul
2010
 9th Overall Tour do Rio
2011
 1st Copa América de Ciclismo

References

1983 births
Living people
Brazilian male cyclists
21st-century Brazilian people
20th-century Brazilian people
People from Cruzeiro, São Paulo